Mohamed Sa'id Pasha (March 17, 1822 – January 17, 1863) was the Wāli of Egypt and Sudan from 1854 until 1863, officially owing fealty to the Ottoman Sultan but in practice exercising virtual independence. Construction of the Suez Canal began under his tenure.

Biography
He was the fourth son of Muhammad Ali Pasha. Sa'id was a Francophone, educated in Paris.

Under Sa'id's rule there were several law, land and tax reforms. Some modernization of Egyptian and Sudanese infrastructure also occurred using western loans. In 1854 the first act of concession of land for the Suez Canal was granted, to a French businessman, Ferdinand de Lesseps. The British opposed a Frenchman building the canal and persuaded the Ottoman Empire to deny its permission for two years. Sa'id signed the concession to build a canal on January 5, 1856.

A 1886 study described Sa'id as "sociable, witty, extravagant, sensual, and fond of all the delights of life, he seemed rather the gay French courtier than the imperturbable Moslem ruler. He set up a court not unlike that of Louis XIV. He welcomed foreigners and entertained most lavishly. He forgot the sobriety enjoined by the Prophet, so that his dinners and his wines became famed for their richness and excellence."

Sudan had been conquered by his father in 1821 and incorporated into his Egyptian realm, mainly in order to seize slaves for his army. Slave raids (the annual 'razzia') also ventured beyond Sudan into Kordofan and Ethiopia. Facing European pressure to abolish official Egyptian slave raids in the Sudan, Sa'id issued a decree banning raids. Freelance slave traders ignored his decree.

When the American Civil War brought a cotton famine, the export of Egyptian cotton surged during Sa'id's rule to become the main source for European mills. At the behest of Napoleon III in 1863, Sa'id dispatched part of a Sudanese battalion as part of the Imperialist coalition in support of the Second Mexican Empire during the Second French intervention in Mexico.

Under Sa'id's rule, the influence of sheikhs was curbed, and many Bedouin reverted to nomadic raiding.

In 1854, he established the Bank of Egypt. In the same year Egypt's first standard gauge railway was opened, between Kafr el-Zayyat on the Rosetta branch of the Nile and Alexandria. In addition, he founded the Medjidieh, a precursor to the Khedivial Mail Line.

Sa'id's heir presumptive, Ahmad Rifaat, drowned in 1858 at Kafr el-Zayyat when a railway train on which he was travelling fell off a car float into the Nile. Therefore, when Sa'id died in January 1863 he was succeeded by his nephew Ismail.

The Mediterranean port of Port Said is named after him.

He married twice, to a first wife Inji Hanim with one son Ahmed Sherif Pasha, and to a second wife Melekber Hanim with two sons, Mahmoud Bey, and Mohamed Toussoun Pasha.

He was buried in Hosh al-Basha the Royal Mausoleum of Imam al-Shafi'i, Cairo, Egypt.

Honours
 : Grand Cordon of the Order of Leopold (civil), 26 January 1855
  French Empire: Grand Cross of the Legion of Honour, 1863
 :
 Order of Glory
 Order of Osmanieh, Special Class
 Order of the Medjidie, Special Class, 1853
 : Grand Cross of St. Joseph, 1856
 : Grand Cross of the Netherlands Lion, 1856

Sources

References

Further reading
 

 

1822 births
1863 deaths
19th-century Egyptian monarchs
Muhammad Ali dynasty
Ottoman governors of Egypt
19th-century deaths from tuberculosis
Suez Canal
Muhammad Ali of Egypt
Tuberculosis deaths in Egypt
Grand Croix of the Légion d'honneur
Knights of the Order of Saint Joseph
Recipients of the Order of the Netherlands Lion
Slave owners